The Chairman of the Ivanovo Oblast Duma is the presiding officer of that legislature.

Below is a list of office-holders:

Sources 
Ivanovo Oblast Duma

Lists of legislative speakers in Russia
Politics of Ivanovo Oblast